Roots Club was an upscale restaurant and  catering hall in Gaza. In 2010, restaurant reviewers expected the restaurant to bring "a new era of hospitality and dining experience" to Gazans.

The club was located on Cairo Street in the Gaza district of Rimal. It features three different dining venues, the informal, outdoor Green Terrace Café; the Ambassador catering hall; and the air-conditioned Roots Restaurant.  One restaurant reviewer described the atmosphere as "vaguely reminiscent of the Anglo-Indian country-clubs of the colonial era."

A reviewer called the menu, which features twelve different meat dishes, chicken prepared thirteen different ways, and eight pasta preparations in addition to an array of salads, appetizers, desserts, and nine kinds of soup served "only in winter," truly staggering.   Lonely Planet calls the Roots Club," "the best" restaurant in Gaza. 

The restaurant was brought to world attention by British journalist Tom Gross and by the Israeli Government Press Office.

Tom Gross posted a photo essay about the new As-Sadaka Gaza Olympic Swimming Pool and the Roots Club restaurant on his web page, alleging that "the manipulative agenda of the BBC and other foreign media agencies" creates a false picture of conditions in Gaza and is "deliberately misleading global audiences and systematically creating the false impression that people are somehow starving in Gaza, and that it is all Israel’s fault."

The Government Press Office was inspired by Gross's dispatch to send an email to journalists reading: "In anticipation of foreign correspondents traveling to Gaza to cover reports of alleged humanitarian difficulties in the Hamas-run territory, and as part of efforts to facilitate the work of journalists in the region, the Government Press Office is pleased to bring to your attention the attached menu and information for the Roots Club and Restaurant in Gaza... We have been told the beef stroganoff and cream of spinach soup are highly recommended."

See also
Economy of Gaza

External links
 Roots Club webpage 
 Roots Club video
 Tom Gross's article

References

Restaurants in Gaza City